Megischus bicolor is a species of parasitic wasp found in the United States and northern Mexico.

References 

Stephanoidea